Mael Fabhaill Ua hEidhin (died 1048) was King of Ui Fiachrach Aidhne.

Mael Fabhaill succeeded Mhic Mac Comhaltan Ua Cleirigh. Events which occurred during his reign included:

 1033. A conflict between the Eli and the Ui-Fiachrach Aidhne, in which Braen Ua Cleirigh and Muireadhach Mac Gillaphadraig, with many others, were slain.
 1048. The son of Donnchadh Gott, royal heir of Teamhair, and Ua hEidhin, lord of Ui-Fiachrach-Aidhne, died.

In 1048, Mael Fabhaill Ua hEidhin, lord of Ui-Fiachrach-Aidhne, died.

References
 http://www.clarelibrary.ie/eolas/coclare/genealogy/hynes_family.htm
 Irish Kings and High-Kings, Francis John Byrne (2001), Dublin: Four Courts Press, 
 CELT: Corpus of Electronic Texts at University College Cork

People from County Galway
11th-century Irish monarchs
1048 deaths